Cade Hall (born February 25, 2000) is an American college football defensive end for the San Jose State Spartans.

Early life and high school
Hall grew up in San Jose, California and attended Bellarmine College Preparatory.

College career
Hall became a starter during his freshman season and finished the season with 41 tackles, 4.5 tackles for loss and a team-high three sacks. As a sophomore, he recorded 39 tackles with one sack and two forced fumbles and led the team with eight tackles for loss. Hall was named the Mountain West Conference Defensive Player of the Year and a first team All-American by Sporting News after recording 10.0 sacks and 12.0 tackles for loss. He was unable to play in the Spartans bowl game.

Personal life
Hall is the son of former NFL defensive lineman Rhett Hall.

References

External links
San Jose State Spartans bio

Living people
People from Morgan Hill, California
Players of American football from California
American football defensive ends
San Jose State Spartans football players
Sportspeople from Santa Clara County, California
2000 births